Christina Schmuck (sometimes listed as Christa Schmuck, born 26 January 1944 in Salzberg) is a West German luger who competed during the late 1960s and early 1970s. At the 1968 Winter Olympics in Grenoble, she originally finished fifth in the women's singles event, but was awarded the silver medal upon the disqualifications of the East German team of Ortrun Enderlein (who finished first), Anna-Maria Müller (second), and Angela Knösel (fourth) when the East Germans were discovered to have their runners being illegally heated.

Schmuck also won two medals in the women's singles event at the FIL World Luge Championships with a silver in 1970 and a bronze in 1969. Both championships took place in Königssee, West Germany.

She also won two medals the women's singles event at the FIL European Luge Championships with a gold in 1967 and a bronze in 1970.

References

External links
Fuzilogik Sports - Winter Olympic results - Women's luge

Hickok sports information on World champions in luge and skeleton.
List of European luge champions 
SportQuick.com information on World champions in luge 
Wallenchinsky, David. (1984). "Luge: Women's Singles". In The Complete Book the Olympics: 1896-1980. New York: Penguin Books. p. 577.

1944 births
Living people
German female lugers
Lugers at the 1968 Winter Olympics
Lugers at the 1972 Winter Olympics
Olympic silver medalists for West Germany
Olympic medalists in luge
Olympic lugers of West Germany
Medalists at the 1968 Winter Olympics
People from Berchtesgaden
Sportspeople from Upper Bavaria